Dr. med. Sommer II is an East German drama film. It was released in 1970 and was directed by Lothar Warneke.

External links
 

1970 films
1970 drama films
German drama films
East German films
1970s German-language films
Films directed by Lothar Warneke
Films set in hospitals
Films whose director won the Heinrich Greif Prize
1970s German films